Archer is an unincorporated community and census-designated place in northwestern Merrick County, Nebraska, United States.  It lies along local roads south of Nebraska Highway 92, northwest of the city of Central City, the county seat of Merrick County.

Demographics

History
The community is named for Robert T. Archer.  A post office was established at Archer in 1887, and it remains open with the assigned ZIP code of 68816.

References

Census-designated places in Merrick County, Nebraska
Census-designated places in Nebraska